Mawuli Gavor is a Ghanaian accountant turned actor, model, TV presenter, entrepreneur and producer.

Early life 
Gavor was born in Ghana. He studied business and finance at Franklin and Marshall College, Lancaster, Pennsylvania, USA.

Career 
Gavor started out in the entertainment industry as a model while in the US as an undergraduate of business management and finance. Upon returning to Ghana, he began his career as an accountant. He however became a brand ambassador to Martini in 2013 and changed his career path. He transitioned into acting in Nollywood movies and is known for the movie Obsession. He has gone on to act in multiple other productions.

In 2018, he produced two films and was also won the Best of Nollywood award for best kiss in a movie alongside Odera Olivia Orji.

Personal life 
Gavor  has sparked multiple dating rumors involving Cynthia Nwadiora and Diane Russet, however Gavor is engaged to longtime Indian-Austrian girlfriend, Remya, there are rumors that the two got married quietly but neither of them have come out to speak on it.

He is a fitness enthusiast.

Filmography

Films

TV Shows

Awards and nominations

References

External links 

Year of birth missing (living people)
Living people
Ghanaian actors
Franklin & Marshall College
Ghanaian film actors